Lisa Hammond may refer to:
 Lisa Hammond (potter)
 Lisa Hammond (actress)